Mathilde Lamolle (born  7 April 1997) is a French shooter. She represented her country at the 2016 Summer Olympics.

References 

1997 births
Living people
People from Aubagne
French female sport shooters
Shooters at the 2016 Summer Olympics
Olympic shooters of France
Sportspeople from Bouches-du-Rhône
European Games competitors for France
Shooters at the 2019 European Games
Shooters at the 2020 Summer Olympics
21st-century French women